Jathi Ratnalu is a 2021 Indian Telugu-language comedy drama film written and directed by Anudeep K. V.. Produced by Nag Ashwin under Swapna Cinema, the film stars Naveen Polishetty, Priyadarshi, Rahul Ramakrishna, and Faria Abdullah while Murali Sharma, Brahmanandam and Naresh play supporting roles. The plot follows three happy-go-lucky men who arrive in the city for a better life but land up in jail for a crime they didn't commit. The film released theatrically on 11 March 2021 and went on to become a blockbuster at the box office. Jathi Ratnalu generally received positive reviews from critics for the performances, direction and its good humour.

Plot 
Srikanth works in his father's ladies emporium in Jogipet, however, he aspires to get an IT job to earn respect from fellow villagers. He challenges his father that he would get a job in two months and leaves to Hyderabad. His unemployed friends, Sekhar and Ravi tag along with him. They struggle to find a house for rent in the city and but finally manage to move into an affluent apartment in Jubilee Hills. Srikanth falls for his neighbour Chitti, and she too likes him.

Meanwhile, Jana Balam Party makes a public announcement that all the ministerial positions will be given only to the deserving candidates, who must have some kind of experience in the field. Chanakya who has insider info about the upcoming Indo-Asian Games in the city manages to get sports ministry over his rival Ramachandra. Chanakya who also lives in the same apartment as Srikanth and his friends, hosts his birthday party. Srikanth gets a job after attending several interviews and the trio attends the party without  an invitation. That night, Chanakya who is shot in his abdomen falls unconscious in their flat. Drunken Ravi pronounces him dead because he checked the right side of his body instead of the left side. While attempting to dispose of the body, they are caught red-handed by the police, who arrest them in the belief that they have a criminal history. Chanakya, however, is alive and to their surprise, he names them as the perpetrators. They are taken to the court to be tried. Chitti, a lawyer by profession who has no knowledge on the law, tries to prove their innocence but the judge unconvinced, postpones the judgment and sends them to jail.

Chanakya bails them out and his men take them to a den and enquires them the whereabouts of his mobile phone which Ravi used while they were trying to dispose of him. Ravi fails to recollect about the mobile. Srikanth overhears that they are going to be killed as soon as Chanakya gets hold of the mobile. They manage to escape by recreating the scenes happened during that day and decide to find the mobile in hopes of blackmailing Chanakya to withdraw the case. They trace the mobile to their car's boot, only to find that the car is in Chanakya's den. While retrieving the mobile, Ravi gets trapped in the car which Chanakya's fans decide to burn as a mark of protest. The next day, Srikanth and Sekhar rescue Ravi. They challenge Chanakya's brother-in-law but the mobile accidentally falls in a tea kettle. As a last hope, they deliver the mobile to Chanakya's rival Ramachandra. But he double-crosses them and joins hands with Chanakya in exchange for money. They are sent to court again for the trial.

In a final attempt to save themselves, Srikanth fabricates a story that Chanakya is involved in a scam with Hong Kong-based businessmen, which everyone believes. The judge orders the police to unravel the conspiracy. In order to escape from the public outrage, the party pressurizes Chanakya to sever all his ties with Hong Kong and withdraw the case, which he obliges. Srikanth and his friends are acquitted of the crime and Chanakya's fan is taken into custody for the attempted murder. The Indo-Asian Games contract is given to Swatantra Electronics. Srikanth goes back to Jogipet to run his own ladies emporium and marries Chitti (who takes up job of providing legal opinions as an Advocate).

In the end, it's revealed that the mobile has a recording of an interview where Chanakya claims to be a national champion in cricket, in which he is goalkeeper.

The video implies, being a sports minister and national champion, he does not know the basics. In cricket, there is no goalkeeper, Only wicketkeeper.

Cast 

 Naveen Polishetty as "Jogipet" Srikanth; Ravi and Shekhar's bestfriend, Chitti's love interest turned husband
 Roshan as young Srikanth
 Priyadarshi as "Jogipet" Shekar
 Rahul Ramakrishna as "Jogipet" Ravi
 Faria Abdullah as Shamili a.k.a. Chitti; Srikanth's love interest turned wife
 Praanya P Rao as Young Chitti
 Murali Sharma as Sports Minister Chanakya
 Brahmanandam as Justice Balwanth Chowdhary; Judge for Chanakya's attempt-to-murder case
 Vennela Kishore as Chanchalguda Santosh; Srikanth, Shekar and Ravi's cell mate
 Naresh as Satish Janardhan; Chitti's father
 Tanikella Bharani as Govindu; Srikanth's father
 Brahmaji as MLA Ramachandraiah
 Giri Babu as Chief minister and Party leader
 Subhalekha Sudhakar as Subash K. Chandra; Swatantra electronics owner
 Mirchi Kiran as Chanakya's brother-in-law
 Divya Sripada as Journalist
 Mahesh Achanta as Chanakya's fans association president
 C. V. L. Narasimha Rao as Lawyer Subramanyam; Chanakya's lawyer
 Satish Saripalli as SI
 Jaya Naidu as Srikanth's mother
 Harini Rao as Chitti's mother
 Keshav Deepak as a Doctor
 Mast Ali as Bawarchi
Shobhan Chittuprollu as tea shop owner
Cameo appearances
 Keerthy Suresh as Vanajakshi; Srikanth's school-time crush
 Vijay Devarakonda as a man in court with a blue shirt
 Anudeep K. V. as Chanakya's fan

Production
The film was announced in October 2019 with Naveen Polishetty, Priyadarshi  and Rahul Ramakrishna playing the lead roles. The film is produced by Nag Ashwin under the studio Swapna Cinema. Director Anudeep KV wrote the story and screenplay. The music is composed by Radhan with the cinematography by Siddan Manohar.

Music 

The film score and soundtrack album is composed by Radhan, who earlier teamed up with the director Nag Ashwin in Yevade Subramanyam (2015). Two songs "Chitti" (written by Ramajogayya Sastry and sung by Ram Miriyala) and "Mana Jathiratnalu" (written by Kasarla Shyam and sung by Rahul Sipligunj) were released as single tracks on 29 January and 19 February 2021 respectively.

Release 
The film was released on 11 March 2021. It began streaming on Amazon Prime Video from 11 April 2021.

Reception

Critical reception 
Neeshita Nyayapati, writing for Times of India gave three stars out of five and termed it as "A madcap comedy featuring 'silly fools'." She opined that in spite of weak story, the one-liners that roll one after another keep you engrossed. She concluded the review calling "Jathi Rathnalu is a mixed bag" but worth for its comedy and the performances." Hemanth Kumar in his review for Firstpost also gave three stars out of five and opined that the script of the film is packed with funny one-liners, and every scene is interesting. Though Kumar felt that the middle of the film was boring due to subplots, he praised the comic timing of Polishetty, Priyadarshi, and Ramakrishna. He concluded, "It is an unapologetic madcap entertainer, and does not hold itself back until the final moment."

The Hindu'''s Sangeetha Devi Dundoo termed the film as "Nonsensical laugh riot". She agreed with Kumar and opined that story was weak as fun wore out in the second half due to the repetition of one-liners. She praised the performances of the lead cast and felt that final courtroom scenes were the highlight of the film, though she would have preferred a shorter film and fewer sub-plots in the post-intermission narrative. Gabbeta Ranjith Kumar writing for The Indian Express praised the performance of Naveen Polishetty for his comedy timings and the chemistry with Priyadarshi and Rahul Ramakrishna. Ranjith Kumar contented, "Practically every dialogue leads to laughs, making the film one of the finest comedies to have come out of Tollywood in a long time."

 Box office Jathi Ratnalu'' earned 8.1 crore on its opening day. On its second day, the film earned a share of 6.5 crore, taking the worldwide gross to 15 crore. On its fourth day, the film earned a share of ₹21.2 crore, taking the worldwide gross of ₹34.1 crore. On its seventh day, the film earned a share of ₹27.6 crore taking the worldwide gross of ₹44.9 crore. At the US box office, the film grossed $470,000 in the opening weekend. , the film has grossed US$1 million at the US box office.

Accolades

Notes

References

External links
 

Indian comedy-drama films
Films postponed due to the COVID-19 pandemic
2020s Telugu-language films
2021 comedy-drama films
Indian political comedy-drama films
2020s political comedy films
Films directed by Anudeep K. V.